Mo Church is a parish church of the Church of Norway in Nord-Odal Municipality in Innlandet county, Norway. It is located in the village of Mo. It is the church for the Mo parish which is part of the Solør, Vinger og Odal prosti (deanery) in the Diocese of Hamar. The white, wooden church was built in a octagonal design in 1864 using plans drawn up by the architect Christian Heinrich Grosch. The church seats about 500 people.

History
The earliest existing historical records of the church date back to the year 1394, but the church was not built that year. The first church at Mo was a wooden stave church that was likely built during the early 13th century. This church was dedicated to the Archangel Michael. Not much is known about the look of the old building.

This new octagonal building was designed by Christian Heinrich Grosch. In addition to the octagonal nave, there is a square choir and small sacristy that extend to the east and a church porch that extends to the west. The new building was consecrated on 6 December 1864 by the Bishop Halvor Folkestad. After the new church was completed, the old church was torn down. The new church was restored in both 1931 and 1978.

Media gallery

See also
List of churches in Hamar

References

Nord-Odal
Churches in Innlandet
Octagonal churches in Norway
Wooden churches in Norway
19th-century Church of Norway church buildings
Churches completed in 1864
13th-century establishments in Norway